Love Case is a 2008 Vietnamese telefilm adapted from Hồ Văn Trung's July 1941 novel Cư kỉnh (居璟). The film was produced by Ho Chi Minh City Television and directed by Võ Việt Hùng.

Plot
The film is set in Cần Thơ's village of Cochinchina in the 1930s. It features a family of district chief Mr.Hàm Tân (Huỳnh Anh Tuấn), in a time when romance novels infiltrated. Neighbour and writer Chí Cao (Trương Minh Quốc Thái) is killed with his paper-knife, but no one knows who his killer is. Suspects include killer Quận (Tấn Beo), Thị Lịnh (Hoàng Minh Minh), Mrs. District-chief Hàm Tân (Thiên Hương) and Túy (Quế Phương).

Production
Shot on location at Gò Công, Saigon, Thủ Dầu Một, Sa Đéc, Trà Vinh, Bến Tre and Da Lat in 2008. The location used as the house of District-chief Hàm Tân was the famous address of Gò Công, its name was Prefecture-chief Hải's Oldhouse.

Film
 Product manager : Nguyễn Việt Hùng
 Assistant director : Lê Cường, Hồ Vân, Lê Văn Quý, Trần Minh Trung
 Accountant : Thúy Anh, Minh Phụng, Minh Hoa
 Camera : Cao Thành Danh, Đinh Anh Cường, Trần Văn Vinh, Đoàn Tiến Dũng, Trần Ngọc Thiện
 Design : Lê Cương, Lê Thắng, Hồng Minh, Vũ Ngọc Tâm, Huỳnh Ngọc Trạng
 Light : Nguyễn Minh Hoàng, Nguyễn Thành Vinh, Nguyễn Văn Đạt, Phan Phú Quý
 Make-up : Ngọc Vân, Hoàn Kim
 Costume : Trịnh Thế Bảo, Vũ Ngọc Linh

Music
 Theme songs "Looking down" (Cúi mặt) and "Round of the sorrow" (Vòng sầu) by Ngọc Sơn with Lam Tuyền's singing.

Cast

 Huỳnh Anh Tuấn ... Mr. District-chief Hàm Tân
 Thiên Hương ... Mrs. District-chief Hàm Tân
 Quế Phương ... Túy
 Thanh Trúc ... Huyên
 Trương Minh Quốc Thái ... Chí Cao
 Quốc Cường ... Mr. Prefecture-chief Huyền
 Phúc An ... Mrs. Prefecture-chief Huyền
 Tấn Beo ... Quận
 Trương Quỳnh Anh ... Bảng
 Mỹ Dung ... Lady Ba
 Hoàng Minh Minh ... Ngô Thị Lịnh
 Tấn Hưng ... Village-chief Tại
 Mai Thành ... Physician
 Ngọc Thảo ... Tú
 Lê Chẩn ... Chó
 Thu Hà ... Tư Thanh
 Tôn Thất Chương ... Thuần Phong
 Hào Khánh ... Clerk
 Minh Luân ... Accountant Thanh
 Thu Nga ... Ngọ
 Lê Cường ... The captain
 Trần Văn Đua ... The cop
 Hoàng Vũ ... Chief of village-guards
 Thierry Blanc ... The procurator
 Alfred ... The judge
 Michel Depart ... The medical-examiner
 Kim Loan ... Translator
 Chánh Thuận ... Canh
 Thủ Tín ... Huê
 Quang Đáng ... Bằng Linh
 Quang Thắng ... Village-teacher Kỉnh
 Hoàng Phong ... Prefecture-chief Huyền in his childhood
 Hoàng Tấn ... First lawyer
 Xuân Hùng ... Second lawyer
 Phan Trung Hiếu ... Bỉnh
 Mai Hạnh ... Village-notable Đống
 Lệ Hoa ... Wife of village-notable Đống
 Văn Tiến ... Tộ
 Minh Cường ... Tí
 Bạch Liên ... The watershop-innkeeper
 Lê Khắc Sinh Nhật ... Guard of the prefecture-chief
 Lê Tiến Phát ... Chí Cao in his childhood
 Thanh Lan ... The oldman loses his whaleboat
 Bảo Nghi ... Daughter of Thị Lịnh
 Diễm Tuyết ... Innkeeper of tailorshop Ngọc Lan
 Như Nguyệt ... The bookshop-innkeeper

and : Cao Kim Loan, Bích Thảo, Trần Ngọc Lìn, Lê Minh Phụng, Hồ Vân, Ngọc Tâm, Ngọc Hồng, Ngọc Phi, Kim Cương, Kim Lan, Thu Hà, Âu Ngọc Thủy, Thanh Vân, Phú Quý, Minh Hoa, Hoàng Oanh, Ngọc Ngự, Thanh Hồng, and Minh Trung

Awards
Love Case received the Golden Ochna Integerrima Award for best film director (awarded to Võ Việt Hùng) in 2009.

References

External links 

 About telefilm Love Case
 Đạo diễn Võ Việt Hùng và những trăn trở về dòng phim xưa

Vietnamese telenovelas
Vietnamese crime films
Vietnamese historical films
Films based on works by Vietnamese writers
Films based on works by Hồ Văn Trung
Films set in French Indochina
2008 films